Pierce County High School is the only public high school located in Blackshear, Georgia, United States. The school is part of the Pierce County School District, which serves Pierce County.

History 
Pierce County High School opened in 1981 following the merger of Blackshear High School and Patterson High School.

Activities

State championships 
 Boys' football (2020)
 Competition cheerleading (2012, 2013, 2015, 2016, 2017, 2018, 2019)
 Boys' golf (1988, 1989, 2009)
 Girls' golf (2000, 2005)
 One-Act Play (1996, 2009, 2018)
 Debate (1982)

Sound of Silver Marching Band 
The Pierce County Sound of Silver Marching Band won grand champion at the Royal City classic in 2007, the Blue and Gray Festival in 2009, and a nationally scored competition in Orange Park Florida in 2010. They won 32 Superior rankings for all 2014 marching band competitions. They hosted the state's largest marching competition, with 24 bands total.

Future Farmers of America 
PCHS won State Forestry Field Day titles in 1982, 1983, and 1988. In 1986, Tony Waller was a member of Georgia's National Champion Forestry Team.

Notable alumni 

 Stetson Bennett IV football player
 Elizabeth Cook singer, songwriter
 Nikki DeLoach actress, singer
 Chad Nimmer Georgia state representative
 KaDee Strickland actress

References

External links 
 Pierce County School District website
 Pierce County High School website
 Pierce County Athletics website
 Pierce County Sound of Silver High School Marching Band website

Schools in Pierce County, Georgia
Public high schools in Georgia (U.S. state)